is a public university at Imizu, Toyama, Japan. The predecessor of the school was founded in 1962, and it was chartered as a university in 1990.

External links
 Official website 
 Official website 

Educational institutions established in 1962
Public universities in Japan
Universities and colleges in Toyama Prefecture
Imizu, Toyama